Guarea carapoides is a species of plant in the family Meliaceae. It is endemic to Peru.

References

carapoides
Flora of Peru
Vulnerable plants
Taxonomy articles created by Polbot